James Frederick Alan Shepherd (born 23 December 1997) is an English professional footballer who plays as a defender for Maldon & Tiptree.

Club career
Shepherd was born in the London Borough of Newham, and grew up in nearby Hornchurch. He started his career with local side Dagenham & Redbridge in 2009, progressing through the youth system to sign a two-year scholarship in the summer of 2014. In January 2016, he was sent out on loan to Isthmian League Premier Division side East Thurrock United to gain experience in senior football. He made two appearances as a substitute during his one-month spell with the Rooks. In February 2016, he was sent out on loan again to Isthmian League Division One North side Barkingside along with fellow scholars Kai Heather, Darren Foxley and David Nicol-Wilson. He featured regularly as a starter for Barkingside as the team struggled near the bottom of the table, he returned to Dagenham in April having made eleven appearances. He made his debut for Dagenham on 30 April in a 3–0 home win over Crawley Town.

In August 2016, he signed for Southern League Premier Division side Hayes & Yeading United on a one-month loan deal. He was a regular starter during his loan spell making six appearances in all competitions during the month. In October 2016, he joined Southern Football League Division One Central side Egham Town on a one-month loan deal, where he went on to make eight first team appearances. In December 2016, he joined Isthmian League Premier Division side Billericay Town on a one-month loan deal. He went on to make four league appearances during the month. In February 2017, he was sent out on loan again signing a one-month loan with National League South side Whitehawk. He spent a month with the Hawks making a total of five appearances. In March 2017, he was sent out on loan for the fourth time of the season, joining Isthmian League Division One South side East Grinstead Town for a month. However, later in the month his contract with Dagenham was terminated and he remained with East Grinstead until the end of the season.

In July 2017, he signed for Isthmian League Premier Division side Harlow Town, where he went on to make 26 appearances in all competitions. In January 2018, he dropped down a division to sign for Isthmian League North Division Maldon & Tiptree.

Career statistics

References

External links

1997 births
Living people
Association football defenders
People from the London Borough of Newham
English footballers
Dagenham & Redbridge F.C. players
East Thurrock United F.C. players
Barkingside F.C. players
Hayes & Yeading United F.C. players
Egham Town F.C. players
Billericay Town F.C. players
Whitehawk F.C. players
East Grinstead Town F.C. players
Harlow Town F.C. players
Maldon & Tiptree F.C. players
English Football League players
National League (English football) players
Isthmian League players
Southern Football League players